Gilbert is a village in Franklin Parish, Louisiana, United States. The population was 521 at the 2010 census.

The Gilbert welcome sign describes the village as the home of U.S. Lieutenant General Claire Chennault.

Geography
Gilbert is located in southern Franklin Parish along U.S. Route 425, which leads north  to Winnsboro, the parish seat, and south  to Sicily Island.

Climate

The climate in this area is characterized by hot, humid summers and generally mild to cool winters.  According to the Köppen Climate Classification system, Gilbert has a humid subtropical climate, abbreviated "Cfa" on climate maps.

Demographics

As of the census of 2000, there were 561 people, 207 households, and 150 families residing in the village. The racial makeup of the village was 62.21% White, 35.83% African American, 0.18% Native American, 1.25% from other races, and 0.53% from two or more races. Hispanic or Latino of any race were 1.96% of the population.

There were 207 households, out of which 36.2% had children under the age of 18 living with them, 47.8% were married couples living together, 19.8% had a female householder with no husband present, and 27.1% were non-families. 24.6% of all households were made up of individuals, and 14.5% had someone living alone who was 65 years of age or older. The average household size was 2.71 and the average family size was 3.25.

In the village, the population was spread out, with 30.3% under the age of 18, 9.3% from 18 to 24, 26.4% from 25 to 44, 19.3% from 45 to 64, and 14.8% who were 65 years of age or older. The median age was 34 years. For every 100 females, there were 81.0 males. For every 100 females age 18 and over, there were 74.6 males.

The median income for a household in the village was $24,297, and the median income for a family was $26,667. Males had a median income of $24,000 versus $14,531 for females. The per capita income for the village was $15,270. About 21.7% of families and 22.4% of the population were below the poverty line, including 39.0% of those under age 18 and 14.1% of those age 65 or over.

Notable people 
 Willie L. Wilson businessman who in 2015 unsuccessfully ran for mayor of Chicago.

References

External links
 Gilbert Progress Community Progress Site for Gilbert, LA

Villages in Franklin Parish, Louisiana
Villages in Louisiana